Johor Darul Ta'zim F.C. or simply JDT is a professional football club based in Johor Bahru, Johor, Malaysia that competes in the Malaysia Super League, the top tier of Malaysian football. Founded in 1972 as PKENJ FC, the club renamed as Johor FC in 1996, before adopting its current name in 2013. Johor Darul Ta'zim is owned by Tunku Ismail Idris, the Crown Prince of Johor.

In 2014, JDT won its first major honour by winning the national league during the first season under Croatian manager Bojan Hodak. Under Argentine Mario Gómez's tutelage, they won the 2015 AFC Cup and the 2015 Super League. By winning the AFC Cup, JDT became the second Malaysian team since 1967 to enter a final of a major continental competition, and the first ever Malaysian club to win a continental title. Between 2014 and 2022, JDT won nine consecutive league titles. Before this achievement, no Malaysian team had ever won the league championship more than twice in a row since the league system was first introduced in Malaysia in 1982.

Since 2012, Johor Darul Ta'zim FC are known by their new nickname, the Southern Tigers, replacing the old nickname Jengking (Scorpion). The new nickname is based on the Johor State Council coat of arms. The team's home ground is the 40,000 capacity Sultan Ibrahim Stadium. Since 2013, the club has developed a fierce rivalry with Pahang and Felda United.

History

The Johor FC Era (1996–2011)
The club were founded in 1972 as PKENJ FC. After winning the Malaysia FAM Cup twice, the Johor Corporation (a state funded corporation) decided to takeover the club in 1996 and changed its name to Johor Football Club (Johor FC). The club finished as the runners-up in the 1996 season.

In 1998, Johor FC were promoted to the second tier Malaysian football league, Liga Perdana 2 and won the title in 2001 which secured promotion to the first division, Liga Perdana 1. After two years in the top division, Johor FC were relegated to the new second-division, the Malaysia Premier League after failing to achieve promotion to the new top division, the Malaysia Super League during the 2003 season. The club earned an automatic promotion to the Malaysia Super League during the 2006–07 season after the Football Association of Malaysia's decision to expand the league to 14 teams and were a regular top 5 finisher in the league. Johor FC were the first club team in the Malaysian football league system to enter the Malaysia Cup in 2000 under English manager Bruce Stowell. The Malaysia Cup was previously dominated by state teams and by defeating ATM on aggregate in the second-round group qualification, the club marked another record in the competition. The club also participated in the AFC Cup in 2009 replacing Negeri Sembilan when the latter qualified but did not proceed to compete in the competition.

Johor Darul Ta'zim era (2013–present)

Starting from 2 February 2012, former Singaporean international footballer Fandi Ahmad began his three-year contract with Johor FA serving as the technical advisor. Later in the year, Fandi assumed the role as the team's head coach. The team eventually finished fourth in the 2012 Malaysia Premier League season.

Tunku Ismail was officially appointed as the new President of Johor FA (PBNJ) in the association's congress held on 16 February 2012. During the congress, he first mooted a proposal to revamp the whole organisation structure and its footballing activities. Part of the plan was to consolidate its football teams into a single representative competing in the Malaysian League.

During the season, there were several match fixing allegations and investigations involving players from Johor-based teams. At the end of the 2012 season, Johorean football was in a poor state. Johor based teams were underperforming and struggling in the Malaysian League. Johor FC barely avoided relegation in the Malaysian Super League, while other Johor-based clubs – Johor FA, Johor Bahru City F.C., and MP Muar F.C. – were struggling to compete in Malaysian Premier League. Just months after Tunku Ismail Sultan Ibrahim took charge as Johor FA's president, a bold strategic revamp within Johor FA (PBNJ) was initiated. The move was to realign and consolidate football teams and clubs representing Johor. It saw both teams, Johor FC and Johor FA being placed under a single management to ensure the stability of both teams. All Johor-based clubs except for Johor FC and Johor FA were withdrawn from the Malaysian League. Both teams were reinstated with same name and were placed in numerical order. In December 2012, the FAM announced that they had received the application of the team's name change to Darul Ta'zim FC for the upcoming 2013 season and with no objections to it. The team was later renamed as Johor Darul Ta'zim Football Club.

Officially, 2013 was the first year in which the Southern Tigers made its debut under the new transformation initiative. A fully refurnished Larkin Stadium was made to accommodate more fans. With the introduction of season passes, it allowed fans entry to all competitive matches for an entire season. At the start of the 2013 season, Fandi Ahmad was handed the role of head coach of the team in the Malaysia Super League, while the Malaysia Premier League team was handled by former international and Johor player, Azmi Mohamed, with the assistance of compatriot Ismail Ibrahim. Before the start of the season, Johor signed former Spanish international Dani Güiza and Italian midfielder Simone Del Nero. However, both left in the middle of the season. JDT managed to reach the 2013 Malaysia FA Cup final on away goals rule, defeating Pahang FA. In the final, JDT lost 1–0 to Kelantan FA. During the middle of the 2013 season, Fandi Ahmad was relieved of his coaching duties, but would stay on as the team's manager. Azmi Mohamed became JDT's coach on an interim basis while waiting for the arrival of a new head coach. In the first season after the club's transformation, JDT managed to finish third in the 2013 Malaysian Super League. Later on, just a day before the 2013 Malaysia Cup kicked off, Fandi Ahmad resigned as team manager and parted ways with Johor FA amicably. With the motivation to rejuvenate the glory days of the past into the future, JDT appointed former Valencia and Atlético Madrid manager Cesar Ferrando Jimenez as the new club's head coach.

In February 2014, Bojan Hodak was appointed as team manager to assist Cesar Jimenez in managerial duties. On 26 June 2014, JDT secured their first national league title by defeating Sarawak FA 1–0. In the 2014 Malaysia Cup campaign, JDT made it through to the final for the first time in 23 years, emulating the former Johor FA that won the double (league and Malaysia Cup triumphs). Billed as the "Match of Heavyweights", it was a highly anticipated match between JDT (league champions) and Pahang (Malaysia FA Cup winners). JDT lost 5–3 in the penalty shoot-out.

On 31 January 2015, JDT competed in the Piala Sumbangsih for the first time in the club's history, qualifying to the competition as the 2014 Malaysian champions. They defeated Pahang 2–0 to win the trophy. The club made their debut in the AFC Cup on 24 February 2015 with a 4–1 win over East Bengal FC in the first game of the group stage. In late April 2015, the head coach Bojan Hodak left the club and was replaced by Roberto Carlos Mario Gómez. As the new head coach, he was also given the authority to revamp youth development programmes in JDT, especially its development squads, from JDT II to JDT V.

On 12 July 2015, an announcement was made that Tunku Ismail Ibni Sultan Ibrahim left his post as president of the Johor FA; instead, he would still serve in his capacity as the Royal Patron of Johor FA. Dato' Haji Ismail bin Karim, State Secretary of Johor, was appointed as his replacement with immediate effect. In August 2015, JDT defended the Malaysia Super League title, becoming the national champions for the second year in a row. On 31 October 2015, JDT became the first Malaysian team to reach the final of the AFC Cup. In the final, held in Dushanbe, Tajikistan, they defeated the home side FC Istiklol 1–0 with a goal scored by Leandro Velazquez. As a result, JDT became the first Southeast Asian club to win a continental title.

In the opener of the 2016 season, JDT edged Selangor in a 7–6 penalty shoot-out win, successfully defending the Piala Sumbangsih title. In the same season, JDT clinched their first-ever Malaysia FA Cup title after staging a comeback 2–1 win over PKNS FC. It was the first time a club side lifted the trophy since its inception in 1990. JDT secured their third consecutive league title on Match Day 20 of the 2016 season with a 3–0 win over Terengganu. The club became the first team to win three consecutive league titles – a feat never achieved before by any team since the inception of the national league championship in 1982. Also in the 2016 season, JDT managed to end the league undefeated, thus becoming the first ever club in Malaysia to have done so.

On 18 January 2017, JDT announced that they had parted their ways with Mario Gómez barely two days before the season opener. The club promoted Mexican Benjamín Mora from JDT II to coach the squad for the 2017 season. On 21 January 2017, despite leading 1–0 at half-time, JDT were denied a third Piala Sumbangsih in a row after losing 5–4 in the penalty shoot-out to Kedah. In the 2017 AFC Champions League qualifying play-off, JDT reached the play-off round for the first time in their history, after eliminating Bangkok United in the second preliminary round after penalties. In the play-off round, JDT lost 3–0 to the Japanese side Gamba Osaka. Following on from that, Perak defeated JDT 2–1 and ended the club's record unbeaten streak of 26 league matches dating back to the opening fixture of the 2016 season.

During the 2017 mid-season break, JDT demoted Mora back into his previous position as the second team's head coach. The club appointed Portuguese Ulisses Morais as the new manager of the main squad. Morais led the team to its fourth consecutive league title; with JDT confirmed to have clinched the 2017 Super League title on 5 August 2017 with three games remaining.

During JDT Congress held in early October 2017, Tunku Ismail made several major moves in the state of Johor. All race-based football associations in the state were disbanded. However these teams will be allowed to continue participating as football clubs in the state competitions. As for the club, major restructuring of the organisation were made to ensure future success in both off and on-the-pitch. Amongst them were the appointment of Martín Hugo Prest as the new Sporting Director, meanwhile the previous Sporting Director, Alistair Edwards was reassigned as the club's Technical Director, responsible for all developmental teams including JDT II, with the team playing in the Malaysia Premier League as a developmental team instead of a feeder club.

After completing the league fixtures in late October 2017, JDT contested in the Malaysia Cup final against Kedah, the 2017 Malaysia FA Cup winners, whom they met earlier in the season opener in January. Playing in front of 80,000 fans at the Shah Alam Stadium, JDT seized the title from the "Red Eagles" with a 2–0 victory and clinched a double in the 2017 season.

In 2018, JDT were eliminated in the quarter-finals of the 2018 Malaysia FA Cup after losing to Pahang 3–0 on aggregate. JDT also failed to defend their Malaysia Cup title, losing to Terengganu in the semi-finals. During the same season, Johor won their fifth consecutive league title.

Club ownership
On the eve of the 2016 season, JDT officially came under the ownership of Tunku Ismail in a statement released by Johor FA dated 10 January 2016. It further clarified that JDT were now turned into a full-fledged professional outfit, as a separate entity from the Johor FA which organises the overall football development programme in the state. As the JDT owner, Tunku Ismail is directly involved in the decision-making process and club management, compared to his previous role as the Royal Patron of Johor FA, when he provided directions and counsel. A day later, former Johor striker who was a key member of the historic double-winning team of 1991, Alistair Edwards was appointed as JDT's Sporting Director to assist Tunku Ismail. The move was seen as part of the privatisation process and a strategic initiative on how Malaysia football clubs should be run and managed professionally including the youth development in the region.

Shortly after, on 12 January 2016, the Sultan of Johor, Sultan Ibrahim Almarhum Sultan Iskandar decided to give RM50 million as a reward to the club. After a successful 2015 season, when the club won the Super League, the Piala Sumbangsih, and the AFC Cup, Sultan Ibrahim made the decision to contribute RM50 million as he was satisfied with how football in the state had united the citizens of Johor and put the state's name on the map.

In an interview published on the club's social media in early December 2016, the majority shareholder in the club is Tunku Ismail himself, who holds 70% of the club.

As part of the restructuring process, the club made an unexpected announcement by naming Luciano Figueroa as the new Sporting Director. His responsibility and focus was on the first team and to assist the head coach, Ulisses Morais. Meanwhile, the previous Sporting Director, Alistair Edwards was reassigned as the new Technical Director and would be responsible to oversee all JDT development and grassroot programmes.

JDT Foundation
The JDT foundation was registered on 9 August 2016. The mission behind the formation of the foundation is to collect funds and distribute aids to the development of the club.

Just days before the 2016 Malaysia FA Cup final, the club announced JDT Foundation, was launched officially in September 2016 as the platform for JDT supporters to be more involved with the team in terms of the team's future and the development of JDT football programmes. JDT Foundation Board of Trustees Chairman Datuk Hasni Mohammad said that it would give opportunity for JDT fans to actually have a "say" in the football club through proper ownership.

With the establishment of the JDT Foundation, fans can become shareholders of the club and send representatives to have meetings with the club officials to understand the club's direction and plans including its monthly financial statement which was planned to be released informing them on all expenditures and its costs. After several postponements, JDT Foundation is slated to be launched in mid January 2017.

The foundation's Membership Card launch was held at the Persada International Convention Centre in Johor Bahru on 7 December 2016.

Appointment of Tunku Tun Aminah as JDT's President
On 27 July 2016, Tunku Tun Aminah binti Sultan Ibrahim, the sister of Tunku Ismail Sultan Ibrahim, has been appointed as the President of Johor DT. Besides focusing on the youth development and attracting youth into sporting activities and active lifestyles, she is also considering an establishment of a JDT women's football team in the near future.

Kit manufacturers
From the 1970s to 2012, the JDT team kit was manufactured by various companies including Adidas, Umbro, Lotto, and Jking.

In the 2014 season, JDT became the first Malaysian club to have Nike as their official kit sponsor. In November 2014, Nike Malaysia created a new special kit for their 2015 AFC Champions League campaign.

On the eve of 2016 season, JDT's signed a contract with Adidas. The new kits were officially unveiled with a commercial video featuring JDT footballers inside the Senai International Airport terminal. The jerseys featured three different designs in red, white and blue, representing the colours of the Johor state flag.

In November 2016, JDT announced that they have signed a three-year deal with Nike, starting with the 2017 season. It was the biggest kit sponsorship ever signed by a Malaysian club. The three-year cooperation encompassed all the teams under JDT, namely main squad, JDT II, JDT III, and JDT IV. The official kit was unveiled on 12 January 2017.

Crest and colours
The club crest is derived from the Johor State Council coat of arms, although all that remains of it on the current crest is the part of the tiger's head.

In 2013, JDT adopted a new logo, featuring a more ferocious looking tiger and a darker colour scheme.

Supporters
Boys of Straits (formerly known as Southern Trooper) is the name of the official supporters of the Johor Darul Ta'zim. The main colours of the supporters are usually blue with a red scarf and banners, like the team's kits colours. The supporters always bring drums and large colorful flags to the stadiums.

Known for their constant singing, drumming, and rallying team throughout a match, they have consistently built-up the spirit of togetherness and camaraderie among the fans of the club's home and away matches. It caught the attention of Hong Kong media during the 2016 AFC Cup quarter-final match with South China AA when they singled out South China's captain Chan Wai Ho for verbal abuse during the second leg of the tie.

Inter Johor Firm was created to support Johor Darul Ta'zim. The early aim of the creation of IJF was to protect JDT fans in away games. But when the fan groups went over capacity, IJF were implicated with a football hooliganism scandal. In late 2014, IJF was officially banned by the club's president to enter any home or away matches.

Other small supporters' groups are Sini Laken, Flag Pole, Brotherhood Johor, and JDT-Sg (Singapore-based group).

Rivalries

Pahang
The rivalry with Pahang began to develop in 2013 after a 3–2 loss in the club's debut in the Malaysia Super League, and an event of overcrowding and crowd trouble during the Malaysia FA Cup semi-final second leg match at Darul Makmur Stadium on 28 May 2013.

Since then, it has developed into an intense and fiery competition between both sides. It has also created an immense atmosphere for supporters and fans of both sides.

Felda United
Beginning in 2013, with JDT's resurrection and emergence as one of Malaysia's football powerhouse to fight for the league titles and other domestic cup campaigns, Felda United became one of the club's main rivals. Between 2013 and 2016, the two sides met on 12 occasions, with JDT triumphant six times, Felda United thrice, with the remaining three games being draws.

In the 2014 edition of the Malaysia Cup, the clubs met in the semi-final for a place in the final. JDT went into the match hoping to complete a "double" after winning the 2014 Malaysia Super League title, whereas Felda United were trying to salvage their season with a cup final appearance and the possibility of winning silverware after being the losing side in the 2014 Malaysia FA Cup final. After Felda won 4–3 in the first leg in a waterlogged pitch at Selayang Stadium, JDT won the second leg 3–1 and earned a place in the final with a 6–5 aggregate victory.

Towards the end of the 2015 season, the 2015 AFC Cup winners crashed to a 2–1 home defeat from Felda United, eliminating JDT out of the Malaysia Cup competition in a quarter-final duel. It was the first home loss for JDT since 2013.

2016: Title decider
Over the course of the 2016 season, the rivalry became highly competitive and intense with both clubs competing for the league title. On Match Day 18 (24 August 2016), the two sides met in a head-to-head match, dubbed as the "Top of the Table Clash". With JDT as the league leaders and four remaining league games, Felda United were determined to stop JDT from creating history as the first Malaysian club to win three consecutive league titles. Playing away at Felda United's home ground, JDT managed to win 3–2 in the title decider.

Stadiums

Tan Sri Dato Haji Hassan Yunos Stadium

Prior to 2020, Johor Darul Ta'zim FC played their home games at Tan Sri Dato' Haji Hassan Yunos Stadium, also known as Larkin Stadium. The stadium was originally built in 1964, with a capacity of 15,000 spectators. The stadium is named after the former Menteri Besar of Johor, Tan Sri Dato Hj. Hassan Yunus.

In 1991, the stadium's capacity was doubled following extensive renovations. An athletics track, floodlight masts and media infrastructure were added to allow the ground to host major events. The stadium was also used for the FIFA U-20 World Cup and Sukma Games.

Sultan Ibrahim Stadium

The Sultan Ibrahim Stadium was completed in January 2020 and is located within the vicinity of JDT Sports City. The club's new headquarters are part of the stadium complex. The stadium has a capacity for 40,000 spectators and was constructed by Country Garden Pacificview at the cost of MYR200 million. It is named after the state's ruler, Ibrahim Ismail of Johor.

Training facilities and infrastructure

Dato' Suleiman Mohd Noor Indoor Training Centre (Johor Bahru, Johor)

Padang Sri Gelam is the training facility for Johor Darul Ta'zim, located at Johor Bahru, Johor. Besides the indoor synthetic field measuring 16 x 109.2 metres, the building comes with the gym equipment, a swimming pool, and ice baths. The project is in line with the vision of Tunku Ismail, who wants international-level training equipment for the players and to help those who are injured to recover faster.

After its design plans were approved on 24 December 2014, the groundbreaking ceremony of the all-weather training arena was held on 1 January 2015, attended by Tunku Aminah.

The development of the RM15 million indoor facility was sponsored by Iskandar Waterfront Holdings (IWH) under its Corporate Social Responsibility (CSR) programme. The 0.8ha indoor facility were designed and built according to the requirements and specifications set by FIFA, the world's football governing body.

After its completion, it was named the Dato Suleiman Mohd Noor Indoor Training Centre as a special recognition and appreciation for his contribution as the "Father of Johorean Football" on 23 February 2016. It was officially opened on 21 April 2016.

Youth development

To demonstrate his ideas and commitment to youth development in the state, Tunku Ismail has entered into partnerships and built ties with various football individuals all over the world. To date, JDT has developed strategic partnership and collaborations with Borussia Dortmund (Germany), Hokkaido Consadole Sapporo (Japan), and Valencia (Spain). Besides signing new young players for development, the club has been organising competitive tournaments across all age groups in the districts of Johor.

In mid-January 2017, the club revealed that they have signed a three-year coaching and player development partnership with Valencia. The partnership was introduced to oversee the implementation of a long-term player development plan for JDT. This plan is based on Valencia Academy's methodologies and development philosophies, adapted to JDT's needs and context.

JDT Football Academy (Kulai, Johor)

As of December 2015, the club is in the process of building a brand new youth academy with up to 15 football pitches and modern facilities, designed in collaboration with Borussia Dortmund, who have entered into a partnership with JDT. The development of the 40-hectare academy in Kulai will be focusing to develop local youth talents from the grassroots level and promote JDT's regional presence.

European Training Centre (Spain)

As part of JDT's Youth Development Plan, the club has announced its plan to build a pre-season training facility in Spain on 21 June 2016. The facility will be used to accommodate JDT's young players for pre-season training, as well as for lodging of youth JDT players who will be on playing stints in Spain.

A delegation of JDT's officials has been sent to Spain to scout for prospective sites for the development of this facility. The site will either be in the region of Valencia or Barcelona.

JDT Sports City
In January 2016, as part of Tunku Ismail's strategic plan to develop the state's football and other programmes, the club announced the development of JDT Sports City. The Johor state government had provided a 70-acre (28.3 hectares) plot of land for the project in Iskandar Puteri, Johor. Under its blueprint, the sports complex will house a new stadium and other sporting facilities such as a hotel, apartments, and a shopping mall.

Players

Current squad

Out on loan

Individual player awards

Malaysian League Golden Boot winners

Development squads
As part of the club's acquisition and subsequent rebranding in 2012, Tunku Ismail Sultan Ibrahim, the Johor Football Association's President, took the decision to rename all the club's teams using the same nomenclature. In addition, Roman numerals were used to denote each team's hierarchy in the club.

In early 2014, the Football Association of Malaysia approved Johor FA's application and officially registered all the club's teams to Johor Darul Ta'zim.

JDT II (Malaysia Premier League)
JDT III (under-21 squad) (Piala Presiden)
JDT IV (under-19 squad) (Piala Belia)

Honours

Domestic

League
 Malaysia Super League
 Winners (9): 2014, 2015, 2016, 2017, 2018, 2019, 2020, 2021, 2022
 Malaysia Premier League
 Winners (1): 2001
 Malaysia FAM League
 Winners (2): 1994, 1995
Runners-up (1): 1996

Cups
 Malaysia Cup
 Winners (3): 2017, 2019, 2022
Runners-up (2): 2014, 2021
 Malaysia FA Cup
 Winners (2): 2016, 2022
Runners-up (1): 2013
 Piala Sumbangsih
 Winners (8): 2015, 2016, 2018, 2019, 2020, 2021, 2022, 2023
Runners-up (1): 2017

Continental

 AFC Cup
 Winners (1): 2015

Doubles and Trebles
Doubles
 Malaysia Super League and Malaysia Cup: 2017, 2019, 2022
 Malaysia Super League and Malaysia FA Cup: 2016, 2022
 Malaysia Super League and AFC Cup: 2015

Trebles
 Malaysia Super League, Malaysia Cup and Malaysia FA Cup: 2022

Season-by-season records

Domestic record

Key:

Pld = Played, W = Won, D = Drawn, L = Lost, F = Goals for, A = Goals against, Pts= Points, Pos = Position

Continental record
All results list Johor's goal tally first.

Performance in AFC competitions

 AFC Champions League: 8 appearances
 2015: Preliminary round 2
 2016: Preliminary round 2
 2017: Play-off round
 2018: Preliminary round 2
 2019: Group stage
 2020: Withdrew
 2021: Group stage
 2022: Round of 16
 AFC Cup: 5 appearances
 2009: Group stage
 2015: Winners
 2016: Semi-final
 2017: ASEAN Zonal Semi-final
 2018: Group stage

Management and coaching staff

Source: Team profile at cms.fam.org

List of head coaches

* As interim manager

See also
 Johor Football Association

Notes

References

External links

 
 

 
Malaysia Premier League clubs
Malaysia Super League clubs
1972 establishments in Malaysia
AFC Cup winning clubs
Malaysia Cup winners
Association football clubs established in 1972